Nieve Berónica Vibieca Aquino (born 6 January 1990) is a Dominican Republic badminton player.

Career 
In 2013, she won the Guatemala International tournament in women's singles events, and became the runner-up in women's and mixed doubles. She also won the Carebaco International tournament in the women's doubles event partnered with Daigenis Saturria.

Achievements

Central American and Caribbean Games 
Women's singles

BWF International Challenge/Series 
Women's singles

Women's doubles

Mixed doubles

  BWF International Challenge tournament
  BWF International Series tournament
  BWF Future Series tournament

References

External links 
 

1990 births
Living people
Dominican Republic female badminton players
Badminton players at the 2011 Pan American Games
Pan American Games competitors for the Dominican Republic
Central American and Caribbean Games bronze medalists for the Dominican Republic
Competitors at the 2010 Central American and Caribbean Games
Competitors at the 2014 Central American and Caribbean Games
Central American and Caribbean Games medalists in badminton
21st-century Dominican Republic women